Viktoria Viga Anna Gerner (born 22 April 1989) is a Liechtensteiner footballer who plays as a midfielder for FC Triesen and the Liechtenstein women's national team. On 11 April 2021, she scored the first official goal for the women's national team, in an international friendly match against Luxembourg.

Career statistics

International

International goals

References 

1989 births
Living people
Liechtenstein women's footballers
FC Triesen players
Liechtenstein women's international footballers
Women's association football midfielders